Kåre Hatten (22 January 1908 – 14 April 1983) was a Norwegian cross-country skier. He participated in the 1936 Winter Olympics, where he placed 12th over 50 km. He was a Norwegian champion in the 30 km in 1932, and competed at the 1934 and 1935 World Championships.

Hatten was known for his eating and drinking habits in competitions. During one 50 km race he consumed six sandwiches and six cups of gruel. He worked first as a lumberjack, and later as a farmer.

Cross-country skiing results

Olympic Games

World Championships

References

1908 births
1983 deaths
People from Trysil
Norwegian male cross-country skiers
Olympic cross-country skiers of Norway
Cross-country skiers at the 1936 Winter Olympics
Sportspeople from Innlandet
20th-century Norwegian people